Carney's is a hot dog and burger restaurant in a yellow Union Pacific rail car on Sunset Boulevard in Los Angeles, California. It was brought to the site in 1978. A second Carney's, also in train cars, is located on Ventura Boulevard in Studio City. A crackdown on weekly biker meetings at that location caused controversy.

Pulitzer-prize-winning LA restaurant critic Jonathan Gold put Carney's on his list of 99 essential Los Angeles restaurants and wrote that, "Carney’s is a restaurant in the real Los Angeles tradition, two ancient Union Pacific cars transported to West Hollywood at great expense and mounted overlooking the Strip, where a mad parade of bass players and catalog models, hustlers and high school kids, movie guys and industry suits stare out the windows of the old bus, onto the profusion of German tourists and Japanese cars that flow down this section of Sunset so steadily that after a few beers and a chili dog or two, the train can appear to be lurching down the track." KTVU movie critic Bob Shaw was fond of Carney's burgers. Carney's serves a chocolate-dipped frozen banana on a stick for dessert.

Carney's was featured in the video games Midnight Club: Los Angeles and Grand Theft Auto V (as "Last Train in Los Santos" restaurant).

See also

 List of hamburger restaurants
 List of hot dog restaurants

References

External links

 

Buildings and structures in Hollywood, Los Angeles
Hot dog restaurants in the United States
Hamburger restaurants
Restaurants in Los Angeles